Cho Won-Kwang  (born 23 August 1985) is a South Korean footballer, who plays for Cheonan City FC in the Korea National League.

His previous club was Anyang LG Cheetahs and Incheon United at K-League in South Korea and FC Sochaux-Montbéliard in France. He played reserve match at both team.

In November 2009, he was moved to Jeju United.

Club career statistics

References

External links
Jeju United Official website 

1985 births
Living people
Association football forwards
South Korean footballers
South Korean expatriate footballers
FC Seoul players
FC Sochaux-Montbéliard players
Incheon United FC players
Jeju United FC players
K League 1 players
Ligue 1 players
Korea National League players
Expatriate footballers in France
South Korean expatriate sportspeople in France
Footballers from Seoul